Billy Westbay was an American rock climber, known for his ascents of El Capitan in California.

Westbay worked as a climbing ranger in Rocky Mountain National Park, and was known for his skills in mountain rescue. He was a skilled and adventurous climber, and was part of the climbing scene that had gathered around Lumpy Ridge.

Westbay was a member of the Stonemasters, an influential group of climbers in California who gathered in locations such as the Yosemite Mountains.

Together with Jim Bridwell, and John Long, Westbay made the first one-day ascent of the Nose of El Capitan in 1975.

Westbay died on 29 July 2000, of bladder cancer at the age of 47.  Some of Billy's ashes were taken and released on top of Longs Peak, Rocky Mountain National Park, Colorado in the summer of 2004.

External links 

American rock climbers
1950s births
2000 deaths
Year of birth uncertain